Fenstad is a village in the municipality of Nes, Viken, Norway. Fenstad lies in the northern part of Nes municipality, east of the Vorma river.

Villages in Akershus
Nes, Akershus